Brown's Falls Reservoir is a man-made lake located by Newton Falls, New York. Fish species present in the reservoir are smallmouth bass, northern pike, brown bullhead, white sucker, rock bass, yellow perch, and walleye. You can only access the lake with permission from Reliant Energy.

References 

Lakes of New York (state)